Andromba is a town and commune in Madagascar. It belongs to the district of Ambatondrazaka, which is a part of Alaotra-Mangoro Region. The population of the commune was estimated to be approximately 3,000 in 2001 commune census.

Only primary schooling is available. The majority 52% of the population works in fishing. 42% are farmers, while an additional 6% receives their livelihood from raising livestock. The most important crops are rice and peanuts; also cassava is an important agricultural product.

References and notes 

Populated places in Alaotra-Mangoro